Balakian is an Armenian surname. It may refer to:

Anna Balakian (1915–1997), Armenian American scholar of Comparative Literature
Grigoris Balakian (1875–1934), bishop of the Armenian Apostolic Church, who was the granduncle of Anna Balakian
Nona Balakian
Peter Balakian (born 1951), Armenian American poet, writer and academic, Professor of Humanities, 2016 Pulitzer Prize winner for Poetry, who is the nephew of Anna Balakian and the great-grandnephew of Grigoris Balakian